Misspellings in French are a subset of errors in French orthography.

Many errors are caused by homonyms, for example French contains hundreds of words ending with IPA [εn] written diversely as -ène, -en, -enne, -aine.

Many French words and verb endings end with silent consonants, lettres muettes, creating also homonyms are spelled differently but pronounced identically: tu parles, il parle, ils parlent, or confusion of je parlais instead of je parlai. Homonyms also occur with accents il eut dit compared with il eût dit.

Further problems are caused by examples of confusion with English, such as connection (incorrect) and connexion (correct).

Misspellings of French words outside the French language occur regularly and account for part of the etymology of some modern loanwords in English - such as English "caddie."

See also
 :fr:Faute d'orthographe
 :fr:Wikipédia:Liste de fautes d'orthographe courantes

References

French language
Spelling